Idalus metacrinis is a moth of the family Erebidae. It was described by Walter Rothschild in 1909. It is found in Ecuador.

References

metacrinis
Moths described in 1909